TIMP metallopeptidase inhibitor 1, also known as TIMP1, a tissue inhibitor of metalloproteinases, is a glycoprotein with a molecular weight of 28 kDa. TIMP1 is expressed from several tissues of organisms.

This protein is a member of the TIMP family. The glycoprotein is a natural inhibitor of the matrix metalloproteinases (MMPs), a group of peptidases involved in degradation of the extracellular matrix. In addition to its inhibitory role against most of the known MMPs, the encoded protein is able to promote cell proliferation in a wide range of cell types, and may also have an anti-apoptotic function.

Function 

TIMP1 is an inhibitory molecule that regulates matrix metalloproteinases (MMPs), and disintegrin-metalloproteinases (ADAMs and ADAMTSs). In regulating MMPs, TIMP1 plays a crucial role in extracellular matrix (ECM) composition, wound healing, and pregnancy.

The dysregulated activity of TIMP1 has been implicated in cancer. In pregnancy, TIMP1 plays a regulatory role in the process of implantation, particularly the cytotrophoblast invasion of the uterine endometrium. Additionally, it plays a role in regulating the transcriptional profile of fetal and placental tissues associated with the early stages of pregnancy. Studies attribute this role to a mechanism involving the chromatin structure at the TIMP1 promoter region, implicating new pharmaceutical possibilities for the therapeutic regulation of TIMP1. Accordingly, TIMP1 can be manipulated in vitro using techniques, like the TIMP1 knock-out.

Other names 
 Erythroid potentiating activity (EPA)
 Human collagenase inhibitor (HCI)

Regulation of TIMP expression

Transcription of this gene is highly inducible in response to many cytokines and hormones. In addition, the expression from some but not all inactive X chromosomes suggests that this gene inactivation is polymorphic in human females. This gene is located within intron 6 of the synapsin I gene and is transcribed in the opposite direction.

In adrenocortical cells the trophic hormone ACTH induces expression of TIMP-1 and the increase in TIMP expression is also associated with decreased collagenase activity.

Increased expression of TIMP1 has been found to be associated with worse prognosis of various tumors, such as laryngeal carcinoma or melanoma.

See also 
 TIMP2, TIMP3, TIMP4

References

Further reading

External links 
 The MEROPS online database for peptidases and their inhibitors: I35.001